Anna-Lena is a feminine given name. Notable people with the name include:

 Anna-Lena Axelsson (born 1956), Swedish orienteer
 Anna-Lena Bergelin (born 1959), Swedish writer, comedian, singer, and actress
 Anna-Lena Forster (born 1995), German para-alpine skier
 Anna-Lena Friedsam (born 1994), German tennis player
 Anna-Lena Fritzon (born 1965), Swedish cross country skier
 Anna-Lena Grönefeld (born 1985), German tennis player
 Anna-Lena Lodenius (born 1958), Swedish journalist, author, and lecturer
 Anna-Lena Löfgren (1944–2010), Swedish singer

See also
 Annalena, given name
 Analena, Croatian-Slovenian post-hardcore band
 Anna (given name)
 Lena (name)

Feminine given names
Swedish feminine given names
German feminine given names
Compound given names